This is a list of seasons played by Swansea City Association Football Club in English and European football. It covers the period from the club's inaugural season in 1912, to the end of the last completed season. It details the club's achievements in all major competitions, together with top scorers. Details of the abandoned 1939–40 season and unofficial Second World War leagues are not included.

Swansea have won the League Cup once, the Football League Trophy twice and the Welsh Cup 10 times. They have also qualified for UEFA Cup Winners' Cup 7 times and the UEFA Europa League once. In 2011, Swansea became the first Welsh club to play in the Premier League.

History

The club was founded in 1912 as Swansea Town, and were elected to The Football League for the 1920–21 season. The club changed their name in 1969, when it adopted the name Swansea City to reflect Swansea's new status as a city.

In 1981 Swansea won promotion to the top tier of English football, achieving a club record highest league finish of sixth position after having led the table for a brief period, but a decline then set in the season after and were relegated, before in 2003 the club narrowly avoided relegation to the Football Conference. In 2000, Swansea won the fourth tier of the English league, during a time this league was known as the Third Division, due to the 1992 formation of the Premier League. They went back into the fourth tier the following season, until a promotion from the newly named League Two followed, achieving a league finish of third place in the 2004–05 season. Three years later, their 2007–08 season in League One, ended in a first-place finish and promotion in the process to The Championship.

After a few near-misses reaching the play-offs, which included a last day of the season miss for a play-off berth, due to a 0–0 draw with Doncaster Rovers during the close of the 2009–10 season, Swansea later finished 3rd the following season. The "Swans" were promoted to the Premier League in 2011 after winning the play-off final at Wembley Stadium against Reading, thanks to a 4–2 victory and in the process became the first Welsh team in that league since its formation in 1992. This was the second time the Swans had made it to the top flight of English football, and having completed seven seasons in the Premier League they have spent a total of nine seasons in the top flight.

In Swansea's centenary year, the club won their first major English trophy beating Bradford City in the 2013 Football League Cup Final.

Key

 Pld = Matches played
 W = Matches won
 D = Matches drawn
 L = Matches lost
 GF = Goals for
 GA = Goals against
 Pts = Points
 Pos = Final position

 Prem = Premier League
 Champ = EFL Championship
 League 1 = EFL League One
 League 2 = EFL League Two
 Div 1 = Football League First Division
 Div 2 = Football League Second Division
 Div 3 = Football League Third Division
 Div 3 (S) = Football League Third Division South
 Div 4 = Football League Fourth Division
 South 1 – Southern League First Division
 South 2 – Southern League Second Division

 F = Final
 SF = Semi-finals
 QF = Quarter-finals
 QR1 = First Qualifying Round
 QR2 = Second Qualifying Round
 QR3 = Third Qualifying Round
 QR4 = Fourth Qualifying Round
 QR5 = Fifth Qualifying Round
 QR6 = Sixth Qualifying Round

 PR = Preliminary Round
 R1 = Round 1
 R2 = Round 2
 R3 = Round 3
 R4 = Round 4
 R5 = Round 5
 R6 = Round 6
 R7 = Round 7
 R8 = Round 8
 R32 = Round of 32

Seasons

Footnotes

References
General

Bibliography

Specific

External links
The full history of Swansea City Football Club – 1912 to 2011 at swanseacity.net
A century of Swansea City at espnfc.com

Seasons
 
Swansea City
Swansea City